It's Already Written is the only studio album by American R&B singer Houston. It was released on August 10, 2004 via Capitol Records. Production was handled by Ralph B. Stacy, Roy "Royalty" Hamilton, Ben Daka, Blaze Da Track, Burton Paul, Jazze Pha, Michael Angelo Saulsberry, Mischke Butler, Soulshock and Karlin, The Trak Starz and The Underdogs. It features guest appearances from Chingy, Don Yute, I-20, Jazze Pha, LeToya and Nate Dogg. The album peaked at number 14 on the Billboard 200, number 8 on the Top R&B/Hip-Hop Albums, and was certified Gold by the Recording Industry Association of America on September 21, 2004.

The album spawned two singles and music videos for "I Like That" and "Ain't Nothing Wrong".

Track listing
"It's Already Written Part I"
"I Like That" (featuring Chingy, Nate Dogg and I-20)
"Twizala" (Intro)
"Twizala"
"Ain't Nothing Wrong"
"My Promise" (featuring LeToya)
"Keep It on the Low" (featuring Don Yute)
"What You Say"
"Love You Down" 
"Alright" (featuring Jazze Pha)
"Bye Bye Love"
"Didn't Give a Damn" (Interlude)
"Didn't Give a Damn"
"She Is"
"It's Already Written Part II (Thunder)"

Bonus tracks for Japan

"I Like That" (Chris Cox Remix) – 3:54
"Ain't Nothing Wrong" (Full Phatt Remix) – 3:41
"Ain't Nothing Wrong" (G4orce Garage Extended Mix) – 4:35
"I Like That" (featuring Chingy, Nate Dogg and I-20) (Video) – 4:15
"Ain't Nothing Wrong" (Video) – 3:25
"Documentary (Video)" – 4:29

Charts

Certifications

References

External links

2004 debut albums
Capitol Records albums
Houston (singer) albums
Albums produced by Jazze Pha
Albums produced by Soulshock and Karlin
Albums produced by the Underdogs (production team)